Jean Williams is a British professor in sport history and author specialising in women's history; sport and literature; sportswear and motorsport. Having previously taught English for a decade, Williams was a senior research fellow at the International Centre for Sport History and Culture, De Montfort University. She acted as a historical consultant to the National Football Museum, particularly for elections to the English Football Hall of Fame. Though mainly known for her work on women's football, Williams has produced a range of material on the history of sports and the social contexts of events: these include articles on a collection of early modern sporting poems and 1950s British Bridge to a chapter on the Indianapolis 500 motor race in the United States. Williams also looked at women's motor racing for a special edition on Britain's motorists published in 2014. In terms of public history, Williams is very interested in the Midlands and wrote about Leicestershire cricketer George Geary for Our Sporting Life, an exhibition held at Curve Theatre in February 2011.

She is a lifelong supporter of Leicester City Football Club.

Williams is author of A Game For Rough Girls: A History of Women's Football in England (Routledge 2003) and A Beautiful Game: International Perspectives on Women's Football (Berg 2007). Her main projects for 2010-11 include a research monograph called A Contemporary History of Women’s Sport (Routledge Research, 2011) and a €17,000 UEFA-funded project: Women's Football, Europe and Professionalization 1971–2011. She is also writing a history of Britain's women Olympians from 1900 to 2012. In 2012 the Oxford Dictionary of National Biography published articles on Leicester swimmer Jennie Fletcher and St Helen's footballing prodigy Lily Parr, for example. Williams has acted as consultant to sports organisations, including FIFA, and for the media, including the BBC Nation on Film Series. She also appeared on the BBC Radio 4 history comedy series You're Dead To Me alongside Greg Jenner and Tom Parry as a football historian.

Williams is also a UEFA 'B' Licence Coach and an FA Child Protection Tutor.

Bibliography

Monographs
 50 Women in Sport (Aurora Metro Books, 2022) 
 A Game For Rough Girls: A History of Women's Football in England (Routledge, 2003)  
 Beautiful Game: International Perspectives on Women's Football (Berg 2007)

Journal guest editions
 'Sport and Literature' a special edition of Sport in History with Jeff Hill (eds) (Routledge June 2009)  ISSN 1746-0263

References

Living people
Sports historians
Social historians
Year of birth missing (living people)
Place of birth missing (living people)
21st-century British non-fiction writers
21st-century British women writers